Mike Christian is an American politician. He served as a Republican member of the Oklahoma House of Representatives.

In 2016, Christian announced that he would not run for re-election, opting instead to run for Oklahoma County Sheriff against incumbent Sheriff John Whetsel. Christian lost that race. Following Sheriff Whetsel's retirement amidst controversy, Christian announced he would again run for Sheriff, but failed to win the Republican primary.

Christian was known for opposing abortion and supporting the death penalty. He threatened to impeach judges who delay executions.

Christian worked for the Oklahoma Highway Patrol from 1995 until 2005, until he retired for medical reasons.

References

Living people
Republican Party members of the Oklahoma House of Representatives
21st-century American politicians
1970 births
Candidates in the 2020 United States elections